Gomuşçu (also, Gomushchu, Gemyushchi, and Gyumushchi) is a village and municipality in the Saatly Rayon of Azerbaijan.  It has a population of 837.

References 

Populated places in Saatly District